Lost Youth is a 1948 Italian-language  drama film directed by Pietro Germi.  The style of the film is close to the  Italian neorealism film movement. It was remade in 1953 as the British film Black 13.

Two important future film directors, Mario Monicelli & Antonio Pietrangeli, co-wrote the script.

Cast

Jacques Sernas: Stefano
Carla Del Poggio: Luisa
Massimo Girotti: Marcello Mariani
Franca Maresa: Maria Rivano
Diana Borghese: Stella
Nando Bruno: Police commissioner
Leo Garavaglia: Manfredi
Emma Baron: Stefano's mother
Dino Maronetto: Berto
Giorgio Metrailler: Gianni 
Franco Pesce: Police photographer
Michele Riccardini: Sor Giuseppe

Awards
The film won 2 Nastro d'Argento awards: Best Script, Best Best Foreign Actor in Italian Film (Jacques Sernas).

External links

1947 films
1940s Italian-language films
Italian black-and-white films
1947 drama films
Films set in Rome
Films directed by Pietro Germi
Lux Film films
Italian drama films
1940s Italian films